Goshawk is a name applied to several species of birds of prey.
Goshawk may also refer to:

Aviation
 Curtiss F11C Goshawk, a Curtiss Hawk-series biplane fighter-bomber
 Curtiss BF2C Goshawk, a biplane primarily used in the Chinese Air Force from 1937 to 1941, also called the Hawk III
 Rolls-Royce Goshawk, an aircraft engine
 T-45 Goshawk, a training aircraft used by the United States Navy

Ships
 , the name of several ships and a shore establishment of the Royal Navy
 USS Goshawk, the name assigned to three US Navy ships, of which only one was built
 USS Goshawk (AM-79), a Goshawk-class minesweeper built in 1919

Books
 Goshawk Squadron, a 1971 novel by Derek Robinson
 The Goshawk, a 1951 book by T. H. White

Other uses
 "The Gay Goshawk", Child ballad number 96, a folksong